1997 Japanese Super Cup was the Japanese Super Cup competition. The match was played at National Stadium in Tokyo on March 5, 1997. Kashima Antlers won the championship.

Match details

References

Japanese Super Cup
1997 in Japanese football
Kashima Antlers matches
Tokyo Verdy matches